The 1981 Illinois Fighting Illini football team was an American football team that represented the University of Illinois during the 1981 Big Ten Conference football season. In their second year under head coach Mike White, the Illini compiled a 7–4 record and finished in three-way tie for third place in the Big Ten Conference.

The team's offensive leaders were quarterback Tony Eason with 3,360 passing yards, running back Calvin Thomas with 390 rushing yards, and wide receiver Oliver Williams with 760 receiving yards. Several Illinois players ranked among the Big Ten leaders, including the following:
 Tony Eason led the conference with 248 pass completions, a 61.1 pass completion percentage, 3,360 passing yards, a 140.0 passing efficiency rating, 20 passing touchdowns, 14 interceptions, and 3,331 total yards.
 Oliver Williams ranked third in the conference with six receiving touchdowns and 20.0 yards per reception and ranked fifth in the conference with 760 receiving yards.
 Kirby Wilson ranked second in the conference with 546 kickoff return yards.
 Mike Bass ranked third in the conference with 33 extra points made, fifth with 10 field goals and a 58.8% field goal percentage, and sixth with 63 points scored.

Schedule

Roster

Season summary

Northwestern
Tony Eason threw three touchdown passes to set the Big Ten single season record. The two teams overall combined to throw 109 passes, breaking the conference mark set earlier in the year by Minnesota and Ohio State.

References

Illinois
Illinois Fighting Illini football seasons
Illinois Fighting Illini football